Shunte District is one of five districts of the province Tocache in Peru.

References